Ruth Fuchs ( Gamm, later Hellmann, born 14 December 1946 in Egeln, Saxony-Anhalt) is a German politician and former athlete. Fuchs, representing East Germany, was the winner of the women's javelin at the 1972 (Munich) and 1976 (Montreal) Olympic Games. She set the world record for the javelin six times during the 1970s.

Her personal best throw was 69.96 metres with the old javelin type, achieved in April 1980 in Split. This ranks her seventh among German old-type-javelin throwers, behind Petra Felke (who held the world record), Antje Kempe, Silke Renk, Beate Koch, Karen Forkel and Tanja Damaske.

Ruth Fuchs has admitted using steroids during her career, as part of the official East German sports programme.

After retirement from track and field, Fuchs became a member of Parliament for the Party of Democratic Socialism (now the Left Party) in the re-united Germany. Since her retirement from public life Fuchs has lived in Bucha, Saale-Holzland, in Thuringia, Germany.

References

Biography from sporting-heroes.net

1946 births
Living people
People from Salzlandkreis
East German female javelin throwers
Socialist Unity Party of Germany politicians
Party of Democratic Socialism (Germany) politicians
Members of the 10th Volkskammer
Members of the Bundestag for Thuringia
Members of the Bundestag 1998–2002
Members of the Bundestag 1994–1998
Members of the Landtag of Thuringia
Female members of the Volkskammer
Female members of the Bundestag
German sportsperson-politicians
Sportspeople from Saxony-Anhalt
Olympic athletes of East Germany
Athletes (track and field) at the 1972 Summer Olympics
Athletes (track and field) at the 1976 Summer Olympics
Athletes (track and field) at the 1980 Summer Olympics
German sportspeople in doping cases
Doping cases in athletics
Olympic gold medalists for East Germany
European Athletics Championships medalists
Medalists at the 1976 Summer Olympics
Medalists at the 1972 Summer Olympics
Olympic gold medalists in athletics (track and field)
Recipients of the Patriotic Order of Merit in gold
21st-century German women politicians